The Royston and Hitchin Railway was an English railway company; it built a line from the Great Northern Railway at Hitchin to Shepreth. A Shepreth branch line was built by the Eastern Counties Railway from Shelford Junction (later called Shepreth Branch Junction) to Shepreth, and in time the line from Hitchin to Shepreth Branch Junction was regarded as a single unit.

The Royston and Hitchin Railway was absorbed by the Great Northern Railway in 1897. For many years the line competed with the Great Eastern Railway line for Cambridge to London traffic, and the route became famous for the Cambridge Buffet Express trains. After 1923 the two routes were under the same ownership but continued to operate in a form of competition.

In 1978 an electrically operated passenger service operated between London and Royston, and nearly all through journeys required a change of train at Royston. In 1987 the rest of the line was electrified, and became the primary route for Cambridge to London journeys, the service on the alternative former Great Eastern Railway route being downgraded outside the commuter peaks hours. The line remains in heavy use today.

Beginnings
The Eastern Counties Railway completed its main line from London to Norwich on 30 July 1845, running from the south through Cambridge and on to Ely. Cambridge was an important industrial and agricultural centre.

The year 1846 was a peak time for the authorisation of railway schemes, part of the railway mania. The Great Northern Railway obtained its authorising Act of Parliament on 26 June 1846; this was a huge project: it was to build a line from London to York, with a number of small branch lines. The Royston and Hitchin Railway had been submitted to Parliament as a proposed Cambridge and Oxford Railway, which would have run as a single track through Royston, Hitchin and Dunstable, but the scheme was very considerably cut back by the Lords in Parliament; there were other contenders in the field for occupation of the route. The railway as actually authorised, on 16 July 1846, was renamed the Royston and Hitchin Railway, and the Lords demanded double track for the truncated version.

The Great Northern Railway had encouraged the Cambridge and Oxford Railway scheme, (now the Royston and Hitchin Railway) and had guaranteed the shareholders 6% on paid-up capital. The GNR wanted to use the line to get access to Cambridge, and at all costs it wanted to keep the Eastern Counties Railway out. If the ECR could seize control of the R&HR it would have yet another penetrating line into GNR territory. The Eastern Counties Railway had secured approval for a Cambridge to Bedford line in 1847, and the GNR tried to get its Cambridge connection using that line, but this attempt failed too, in 1848.

Extending to Shepreth
However the Royston and Hitchin Railway had more success: on 14 August 1848 it obtained an Act to extend its line from Royston to Shepreth, joining the Cambridge to Bedford branch there. If the Eastern Counties failed to construct its Cambridge to Bedford line in a reasonable time, the R&HR would have power to build the line itself.

Construction of the Royston and Hitchin Railway was not difficult and not expensive, and the  miles from Hitchin junction to Royston were opened on 21 October 1850. The route was hilly and the line had a series of gradients. Beyond Royston the line, still under construction, was also beset by gradients, one as steep as 1 in 100. The line served a purely agricultural district, but a connecting bus service ran between Royston and Cambridge. The extension of 5 miles 4 chains to Shepreth was brought into use on 1 August 1851. A service of five daily omnibuses between Shepreth and Cambridge was laid on, taking 40 minutes for the 9 miles. The fastest combined journey from King's Cross to Cambridge was 130 minutes by the 09:15 northern express. Fares were lower than on the ECR, but the service did not prove viable. For the time being the R&HR was simply a short branch line in a purely agricultural area, and the GNR was paying nearly £15,000 a year because of its guarantee.

Eastern Counties line to Shepreth
The Eastern Counties Railway was compelled by a condition in its Act to open its line to Shepreth without undue delay; despite considerable prevarication, it opened from Shelford Junction to Shepreth on 1 April 1852, with works constructed for double line, although only a single line was laid. It was 5 miles 28 chains in length, and ran to an end-on junction with the R&HR at Shepreth. The Board of Trade Inspecting Officer sanctioned opening only on condition that the ECR could use the R&HR turntable at Shepreth. It seems that through carriages were worked between King's Cross and Cambridge. The ECR paid £300 per annum for use of Hitchin station. The ECR was always well behind in payment of rent, as was its successor, the Great Eastern

During this period the Eastern Counties Railway had opened negotiations to lease the R&HR, and a fourteen-year lease had been agreed in February 1852, to start from the connection of the lines at Shepreth: the ECR would pay £16,000 per annum guaranteed rent and interest on the R&HR. The GNR was not sorry to have passed over the financial obligation for the R&HR to its rival. The GNR agreed to pay the ECR 60% of any earnings in respect of King's Cross and Hitchin traffic to and from Cambridge and stations east of Ashwell on the R&HR. During the operation of the lease, the Railway Clearing House referred to it as the "Shelford & Hitchin Railway". Three daily services, subsequently four, with two on Sundays, were provided between Cambridge and Hitchin.

The Eastern Counties and others merged and together formed the Great Eastern Railway, by Act of 7 August 1862.

Reversion to the Great Northern Railway
Towards the end of the lease period, the GNR gave consideration to taking over the R&HR Company, but there was obstruction from the GER about actually reaching Cambridge over their tracks (from Shelford Junction). During the lifetime of the lease, the Bedford and Cambridge Railway had opened its line on 7 July 1862. The line was worked by the London and North Western Railway, which was friendly to the GNR at that time. The GNR therefore put forward two alternative proposals: one envisaged running powers from Shepreth to Cambridge, doubling of the track between Shepreth and the main line, use of the GER Cambridge station and a one-mile extension to a separate terminal; the alternative was to be an extension from Shepreth to the Bedford and Cambridge Railway, joining it  miles east of Lord's Bridge, with running powers over that line to the outskirts of Cambridge, and then a new two-mile branch would run to the town centre.
 
The GER saw that if the second choice materialised, they would be left in possession of a useless short branch that ended at Shepreth, and they agreed to the GNR's wishes, signing an agreement on 2 May 1864. An Act in that year conceded to the GNR full running powers to Cambridge station, where all facilities and a separate platform would be provided; double track capable of carrying express services was promised between Shepreth and Shelford by 31 March 1866, the last day of the lease, on the expiration of which the R&HR line would be returned to the GNR.

Track maintenance shortcomings
The ECR and later the GER were supposed to have kept the leased line in good order, but the GER was not in good financial health. In December 1865 GNR and GER engineers made a joint inspection of the R&HR line. The stations and permanent way were in a state of dilapidation, and there were insufficient sleepers to each length of rail. The GNR's engineer demanded that 11,400 sleepers should be renewed. When the line was handed back on 1 April 1866, the sleepers had been supplied but not installed, and it was left to the GNR to put the road in order. Eleven miles had been relaid and 5,000 new sleepers inserted within three months; nevertheless on 3 July a fatal derailment occurred.

Captain Tyler reported on the causes of the derailment. The permanent way was laid with 16-foot rails, and the joints were not fished. The sleepers were widely spaced, with only four for each rail length; many were "in the last stages of rottenness". The track geometry near the point of derailment was very poor ("wavy" in Tyler's words).

 I find that this portion of railway, which had been for some 11 years in the charge of the Great Eastern Company, was taken over, at the expiration of the agreement under which it was worked, by the Great Northern Company, on the 1st April last. I learn from the engineer of the Great Northern Railway that he inspected it, with the engineer of the Great Eastern Company, in December 1865, and that he then required that 11,400 new sleepers should be inserted in the permanent way; but this not having been done, the same number of new sleepers were handed over to the Great Northern Company, with the line, in April. Out of 18 miles of double or 36 miles of single line thus taken over, 11 miles have since been re-laid, with fished joints, and sleepers 2 feet apart at the joints, and 2 feet  inches apart in the intermediate spaces; besides which, 5,000 new sleepers have been inserted by the ordinary gangs. I am glad to learn also that... the re-laying of the whole 18 miles may be completed in 12 weeks from the present time... Orders have wisely been given to slacken the speed of the trains pending the completion of this re-laying; and the posts have been erected, and wires strained, for providing telegraphic communication, which, strange to say, had not previously been supplied.

The GER section east of Shepreth was in no better shape, and on the previous 31 May, the 7.10 p.m. from Cambridge was derailed between Shelford Junction and Shepreth, but there were no serious casualties. This section had not been doubled as promised; nor was the accommodation provided at Cambridge, where there was no shelter for GNR passengers. W. Bell & Sons, the contractors for these works, had ceased operations when the GER was unable to pay them, leaving the GNR to advance £5,000 for the work to proceed. From 1 January 1868 the GNR provided its own staff at Cambridge for passenger traffic. Doubling the line between Shelford Junction and Shepreth was completed early in May 1867, and the electric telegraph was working between Hitchin and Cambridge a few months afterwards.

As the GNR were maintaining the greater, western part of the line, they took over the maintenance of the Shepreth to Shelford Junction line, by arrangement for 21 years from 1 January 1874; the GE allowed £320 per mile per annum out of the tolls. Next it was resolved to re-signal the whole Cambridge line and install the block system. An intermediate box was erected at Letchworth, between Hitchin and Baldock, although at that time there was no station there. A new box and additional sidings were provided at Baldock in 1875. Two years later new boxes were built at Ashwell, Royston, Meldreth and Shepreth. The GER paid for new signalboxes at Harston and Foxton and improved the signalling at Shelford junction. Saxby & Farmer did the re-signalling and all the works were finished in April 1878.

Letchworth
Sir Ebenezer Howard published his book "Tomorrow a Peaceful Path to Real Reform" in which he put forward the notion of a Garden City; his work included heavy reliance on a railway connection. As a direct result, the world's first Garden City was founded at Letchworth in 1903. Construction workers used a wooden halt there from 1903. Regular passenger services were provided at the halt from 15 April 1905; a goods depot was added on 19 August 1907, and a permanent station on 18 May 1913. This station had two island platforms, giving four platform faces, but they were never used as such.

Train service to 1923
Slip carriages were slipped at Hitchin for the Cambridge line in the August 1872 timetable, off the 10:10 and the 14:45 from Kings Cross, at Hitchin for Cambridge. The up express due at Kings Cross at 11.55 am slipped at Hitchin for Cambridge. Competition with the GER for London-Cambridge traffic was keen. In the summer of 1880, the GNR put on a noon express from Cambridge which was allowed only 75 minutes, with a Hitchin stop. It was one of the few up trains then which did not stop at Finsbury Park. The best down train, the Cambridge portion of the 17:00 from Kings Cross, took 80 minutes with Hitchin and Royston stops.

At the end of 1883, the 12:00 Cambridge to Kings Cross was given a Royston stop, and the overall schedule increased to 77 minutes, which remained for some years. By 1888, the 17:00 from Kings Cross was allowed the same time, also with Hitchin and Royston stops. The GNR introduced an express service between King's Cross and Cambridge (95 minutes, then 90 down, 100 up) from 1 April 1866. By 1883 up journeys of 75 minutes were possible but GER acceleration ended the possibility of effective competition and the GNR, while maintaining good speeds (in 1898 there were six down and five up trains in times of 77 to 82 minutes), wisely determined to concentrate on the development of traffic at intermediate points as much as at Cambridge itself.

Acquisition by Great Northern Railway
The Royston and Hitchin Railway company was acquired by the GNR by Act of 3 June 1897, effective on 1 July 1897

The twentieth century
Hostility between the Great Northern Railway and the Great Eastern Railway cooled in the twentieth century. By arrangement GNR traffic staff were withdrawn from Cambridge in July 1912, but four GNR engines were still based there. There were still five or six fast trains each way between King's Cross and Cambridge. The 17:00 down made its 75 min trip with an additional Royston stop from 1912, but the best up trains took 80 minutes.

In 1923 most of the main line railways of Great Britain were reorganised into one or other of four new larger companies, in a process called the "grouping", following the Railways Act 1921. The Great Northern Railway was a constituent of the new London and North Eastern Railway, the LNER. The Great Eastern Railway too joined the LNER, so that both routes between Cambridge and London were under the same ownership. In May 1932 five daily "Garden Cities Expresses" were run, at first taking 82 minutes down and 77 up, soon renamed "Cambridge Buffet Expresses". From July 1932 they were accelerated to 75 and 72 minutes respectively. They were suspended at the outbreak of World War II in 1939, but they were reinstated on 6 December 1948, with four daily services in times of 82 to 90 minutes. In the pre-war years the original three-coach formations had on occasion to be strengthened to as many as nine or ten coaches.

Since 1960
At Letchworth, Baldock and Royston considerable residential and industrial growth has occurred. At Letchworth, population had grown to 30,945 by 1971 and many of its industries (principally engineering, printing, food preparation and the making of clothing and furniture) had developed alongside the railway. In 1965 Letchworth despatched 64,197 tons of freight in full wagon loads and 8,554 in smaller consignments, while the station issued 151,295 ordinary and 2,795 season tickets, collecting 168,015. Farther to the north-west Foxton was linked to a cement works near Barrington by a short branch line sanctioned by a Light Railway Order of 1920.

Electrification
In the 1970s the Inner and Outer Suburban services from Kings Cross were electrified. The Inner Suburban service, to Welwyn Garden City and Hertford North was commissioned first, followed by the Outer service, which was electrified as far as Royston. The first Outer Suburban electric multiple unit was received in July 1977, and from 3 October some entered service on existing diesel timings. The full Royston electric service of three per hour, and up to seven in the peak, started on 6 February 1978. For the time being a diesel service operated in connection between Royston and Cambridge.

Continuation of the electrification from Royston to Cambridge was authorised in March 1987, the Bishop's Stortford to Cambridge section having been commissioned on 19 January 1987. Electric operation to Cambridge started on 16 May 1988.

Location list

 Hitchin, Cambridge Junction;
 Letchworth; used by workmen from 15 April 1905; relocated 18 May 1913; renamed Letchworth Garden City 17 June 1999; 
 Baldock; opened 21 October 1850; still open;
 Ashwell & Morden; opened 21 October 1850; renamed Ashwell & Morden 1 April 1920; still open;
 Royston; opened 21 October 1850; still open;
 Meldreth; opened 1 August 1851; renamed Meldreth & Melbourn 1 May 1879; still open; 
 Shepreth; opened 1 August 1851; still open;
 Foxton; opened 1 April 1852; still open;
 Harston; opened 1 April 1852; closed 17 June 1963;
 Shepreth Branch Junction.

Notes

References

Rail transport in Cambridgeshire